"Amor", also known as "Amor Amor" and "Amor Amor Amor" is a popular song.

The music was written by Gabriel Ruiz, the original Spanish lyrics  by Ricardo López Méndez, with English lyrics written by Sunny Skylar. The song was published in 1943.

Versions

The two biggest-selling versions in the United States were recorded by Bing Crosby and Andy Russell.

The recording by Bing Crosby was recorded on February 17, 1944  for Decca Records as catalog number 18608. It first reached the Billboard magazine Best Seller chart on June 29, 1944, and lasted 7 weeks on the chart, peaking at #4. The flip side was "Long Ago (and Far Away)", which also charted, making this a two-sided hit.

The recording by Andy Russell was released by Capitol Records as catalog number 156. It first reached the Billboard magazine Best Seller chart on May 25, 1944, and lasted 8 weeks on the chart, peaking at #5.

In 1944, Dale Evans performed the song in the film Lights of Old Santa Fe.

Years later in 1949, the song was recorded by Alfredo Antonini and his orchestra in collaboration with Victoria Cordova and John Serry Sr. for Muzak.

In 1961, American soul singer Ben E. King covered the song, and it appears on his album Spanish Harlem. It was released as a single and peaked at #18 on the Billboard Hot 100 and #10 on the R&B chart.

Rod McKuen recorded a disco version in 1977. 

In 1978, the German Schlager singer Bata Illic released a German version with lyrics written by Michael Marian.

In 1982, Julio Iglesias covered the original Spanish language song on his album Momentos (1982). It was released as a single from the album. In that year, he also recorded French, Italian and Portuguese versions of his albums in these languages.

In 2001, Luis Miguel covered the song, which was released as the lead single from his album Mis Romances (2001). The song peaked at #13 on the Billboard Hot Latin Songs chart. It served as the main theme for the Mexican telenovela El Manantial.

Film appearances
1944 Broadway Rhythm and Lights of Old Santa Fe. 
1949 Maytime in Mayfair
1959 This Earth Is Mine - sung in Spanish by an uncredited male singer.
1997 Lolita
Andy Russell sang a mixture of English and Spanish in the 1946 film Breakfast in Hollywood.

References

1943 songs
1961 singles
1982 singles
2001 singles
Ben E. King songs
Bing Crosby songs
Luis Miguel songs
Julio Iglesias songs
Warner Music Latina singles
Telenovela theme songs
Song recordings produced by Luis Miguel
Songs written by Sunny Skylar